Titignano may refer to:

Titignano, Cascina, a village in the province of Pisa, Italy
Titignano, Orvieto, a village in the province of Terni, Italy